Explorer Two, Explorer II, Explorer 2, or variation, may refer to:

Vehicles
 Explorer II (1935), a manned high-altitude balloon from National Geographic and the U.S. Army that set the manned high altitude record
  (1989), a cruise ship
 Raven Explorer II, a U.S. autogyro kitplane
 JUST Explorer II, a Chinese scientific research autonomous underwater vehicle
 Foday Explorer II, a Chinese SUV

Other uses
 Explorer 2 (1958), a failed U.S. Army exploratory satellite
 Rolex Explorer II (1971), a wristwatch developed for explorers and adventurers
 Charter Arms Explorer II pistol, a .22 calibre pistol

See also
 Explorer (disambiguation)
 Explorer 11 (1961), a NASA space telescope
  (1966), a hydrographic survey ship